Joseph Everett Sparks (born March 15, 1938) is a retired American professional baseball player, manager, coach and scout.

Sparks managed in minor league baseball for all or part of 20 seasons (1970–78; 1980–83; 1986–88; 1991–94) in the farm systems of the Chicago White Sox, Houston Astros, Cleveland Indians, Kansas City Royals, Montreal Expos and Detroit Tigers and compiled a career won/loss mark of 1,330–1,247 (.516). From 1986–88, he won three consecutive American Association championships while at the helm of the Indianapolis Indians, then Montreal's top affiliate. He also won the championship of the Class A Northern League in 1970, his maiden season as a manager.

Sparks served one-year coaching terms in Major League Baseball with the White Sox, Cincinnati Reds, Expos and New York Yankees, and was an advance scout for the St. Louis Cardinals for eight seasons (1996–2003). He then served in the same role for the Oakland Athletics.

His son, Greg, a former minor league first baseman, manager and hitting instructor in the Athletics' minor league system, has been the assistant MLB hitting coach of Joe Sparks' former longtime employer, the White Sox, since 2016.

References

External links
 Retrosheet

1938 births
Living people
Baseball players from West Virginia
Chicago White Sox coaches
Cincinnati Reds coaches
Columbus White Sox players
Danville Leafs players
El Paso Sun Kings players
Eugene Emeralds players
Evansville White Sox players
Hastings Giants players
Indianapolis Indians managers
Iowa Oaks players
Lynchburg White Sox players
Major League Baseball first base coaches
Major League Baseball hitting coaches
Major League Baseball third base coaches
Michigan City White Caps players
Montreal Expos coaches
New York Yankees coaches
Oakland Athletics scouts
St. Louis Cardinals scouts
Springfield Giants players
Tacoma Giants players
Toledo Mud Hens managers